is a Japanese swimmer.

At the Tokyo event of the 2018 FINA Swimming World Cup, Namba won a silver medal in the Women's 400m freestyle, and a bronze medal in the 800m freestyle. In the 2019 World Cup, she took bronze in the 400m freestyle. She placed second in the 800m freestyle at the 2019 FINA World Junior Swimming Championships.

In April 2021, Namba qualified to represent Japan at the 400m freestyle and 800m freestyle at the 2020 Summer Olympics. In the 400m freestyle qualifying competition, Namba was ahead of the field for most of the race, but lost to Waka Kobori with a time of 4:06.36 against Kobori's 4:06.34.
Namba won the 800m freestyle qualifying final in 8:26.61, with Kobori second with 8:26.67.

At the 2020 Summer Olympics, Namba finished 20th in the 400m freestyle with a time of 4:13.49, and 17th in the 800m freestyle at 8:32.04, and did not qualify for either final.

References

2002 births
Living people
Japanese female freestyle swimmers
Swimmers at the 2020 Summer Olympics
Olympic swimmers of Japan
Medalists at the FINA World Swimming Championships (25 m)